Thomas Marijnissen (born 29 December 1998) is a Dutch professional footballer who plays as a left winger for Eerste Divisie club NAC Breda.

Club career
He made his professional debut in the Eerste Divisie for NAC Breda on 25 November 2016 in a game against SC Cambuur.

Marijnissen took a career break at the age of 18, because he no longer felt the happiness about playing football, especially after his father's death.

In mid-2018, he resumed his career, in the Eerste Klasse for RKSV Rood-Wit Willebrord. From early 2019 until the summer break, he played for the Belgian Zwarte Leeuw in the fifth-tier Belgian Division 3. Afterwards, he returned to the Netherlands to play for RKSV Halsteren, before moving to third-tier Tweede Divisie club Kozakken Boys in August 2020.

Marijnissen returned to NAC Breda on 25 July 2022 after having left the club five years earlier. He signed a two-year contract.

References

External links
 
 

1998 births
Footballers from Breda
Living people
Dutch footballers
NAC Breda players
RKSV Halsteren players
Kozakken Boys players
Eerste Divisie players
Tweede Divisie players
Eerste Klasse players
Association football midfielders
Dutch expatriate footballers
Expatriate footballers in Belgium
Dutch expatriate sportspeople in Belgium